The Beagle Islands are a small group of islands in Western Australia, found approximately  north-west of Leeman.

Island group
The Beagle Islands are a group of three individual islands:

Geology
The islands formed approximately 10,000 years ago after large fluctuations in sea levels caused erosion on large areas of the continental shelf during periods of glaciation. Large parallel sand dunes then formed and hardened into limestone, forming islands, most of which have been separated from the mainland for 6,500 years.

Well preserved Tamala limestone geological features can be found on all of the Turquoise Coast islands, with supra-tidal hard coral fossils being found on the Beagle Islands.

Sea lions
The islands are home to the largest population of Australian sea lions in Western Australia, The breeding colony is estimated to be between 150 and 250 animals depending on the breeding cycle. East Beagle island is also home to the tree-like form of the Nitre Bush, an important habitat for sea lions when pupping.

Wreck
In 1905 a boat was reported as being wrecked near the islands and in 1934 a fisherman drowned after being swept overboard.

See also
 List of islands of Western Australia

References

Islands of the Mid West (Western Australia)
Nature reserves in Western Australia
Turquoise Coast (Western Australia)